Denver Grainger-Barras (born 17 April 2002) is a professional Australian rules footballer with the Hawthorn Football Club in the Australian Football League (AFL).

Early career

Denver Grainger-Barras started off at his local club Kalamunda, progressing through Auskick, before Swan Districts development coaches invited him to train with their club.
Playing in the colts competition he would later step up into the seniors while still eligible for the underage competition.

He was injured in his first senior game requiring shoulder surgery. 
 
Named in the 2018 under 16s All Australian team he represented Australia playing against New Zealand. 

Selected as an All Australian in 2020 as a 18 year old Denver also managed to play in all of Swan Districts senior games in 2020.

AFL career

Denver injured his knee in the last practice match of the 2021 pre-season. This delayed his debut until round 15. He was subbed off in his first game after suffering concussion.

He changed his number to number 24 following his debut season.

Prior to the beginning of the 2022 season, Denver signed a 2 year contract extension with Hawthorn, to the end of 2024 
He played 16 senior AFL matches in his second season in 2022.

Statistics
Updated to the end of the 2022 season.

|-
| 2021 ||  || 38
| 5 || 0 || 0 || 25 || 12 || 37 || 17 || 11 || 0.0 || 0.0 || 5.0 || 2.4 || 7.4 || 3.4 || 2.2 || 0
|-
| 2022 ||  || 24
| 16 || 0 || 0 || 87 || 47 || 134 || 49 || 23 || 0.0 || 0.0 || 5.4 || 2.9 || 8.4 || 3.1 || 1.4 || 0
|- class="sortbottom"
! colspan=3| Career
! 21 !! 0 !! 0 !! 112 !! 59 !! 171 !! 66 !! 34 !! 0.0 !! 0.0 !! 5.3 !! 2.8 !! 8.1 !! 3.1 !! 1.6 !! 0
|}

References

External links

Living people
2002 births
Australian rules footballers from Western Australia
Swan Districts Football Club players
Box Hill Football Club players
Hawthorn Football Club players